Pieter Stoop is a Dutch painter of large abstract paintings.

Pieter Stoop acquired his artistic education at the Academy of Catholic Education, Tilburg (1962–1966) and at the Jan van Eyck Academy of Maastricht (1966–1972). At the end of his studies he obtained the Prize for the Visual Arts of the city of Maastricht (1972), and later on he received financial support to do a study trip to Morocco (prins Bernhard Fonds, 1974), and to New York City en Mexico (travel grant CRM, 1979). Specialised in painting and sculpture and influenced by Soutine, Willem de Kooning and Bram van Velde, the artist revolutionized painting with “Nieuwe Schilderijen”. This school conceived art according exclusively to its materiality. Stoop focused on the painting materials and applied them thickly layer after layer to achieve a thick quality on the canvas. 

“The essence is not that Pieter Stoop takes the landscape as his starting point; what matters is how the movement of paint and colour transforms the surface into something else: the painter’s art. Pieter Stoop makes beautifully modulated paintings.”
R. H. Fuchs

Large canvases constitute his working sphere, which are dealt with through a long process that brings the artist to alternate oil painting with small-format drawings and acrylic paintings to make a quick sketch.  Pieter Stoop does currently live in Eindhoven.

Studies
1962-1966 Academy of Fine Art, Tilburg, Netherlands.
1966-1972 Jan van Eyck-Academy, Maastricht, Netherlands.

Museum collections

Stedelijk Museum, Amsterdam
Van Abbemuseum, Eindhoven
Centraal Museum, Utrecht

References

External links
 Pieter Stoop at BKRkunst
 Galeries.nl, Netherlands
 Galery Dijkstra, Waalwijk, Netherlands

1946 births
Dutch painters
Dutch male painters
Living people
People from Breda